Tokusegawa Masano (德瀬川 正直, born August 6, 1983 as Badamsambuu Ganbold) is a former sumo wrestler from Ulan Bator, Mongolia. Joining the professional sport in 2003, he entered the top division for the first time in March 2010, and rose to the top of the maegashira ranks. He was forced to retire by the Japan Sumo Association in 2011 after being found guilty of match-fixing.

Career
Tokusegawa's debut tournament in maezumo was considered a rather ignominious one, as he was cautioned by judges for cursing in Mongolian at a fellow Mongolian wrestler and slapping the wrestler's chest just after losing to him.  He soon went on to distinguish himself though, steadily rising through the ranks.  Except for a period in early 2005 where he suffered three consecutive losing tournaments while struggling in the sandanme division, he never had two consecutive losing tournaments. He took the  sandanme championship in the November 2006 tournament with a 7–0 perfect record.  His sumo became even more consistent and after a slow but steady rise to the upper ranks of the makushita division, he took the championship in the May 2009 tournament.  As a result,  he became the first wrestler from his stable to be promoted to the elite sekitori ranks. It took him only four tournaments to make his way through the second jūryō division, in which he suffered only one losing tournament.  He came through with winning records in his first three top makuuchi division tournaments before recording his first make-koshi at maegashira 4 in September 2010. He responded with scores of 8–7 in November (which included a win over ozeki Kotooshu) and 9–6 in January 2011.

After the January 2011 tournament Tokusegawa's Kiriyama stable shut down and he moved with his stablemaster to the affiliated Asahiyama stable.

Retirement from sumo

In April 2011 Tokusegawa was one of 23 wrestlers found guilty of match-fixing after an investigation by the Japan Sumo Association (JSA), and he was forced to retire from sumo. He responded, "I can't accept (this punishment). But what am I supposed to do if I oppose the JSA's decision?" He would have reached a new highest rank of maegashira 1 in the May 2011 tournament.

Following his retirement Tokusegawa returned to his native country and participated in Mongolian wrestling, winning the Western Region Danshig Nadaam tournament in 2012.

Fighting style
Tokusegawa was a yotsu-sumo specialist, preferring grappling techniques. His favoured grip on his opponent's mawashi was migi-yotsu (left hand outside, right hand inside) and his most common winning kimarite were yori-kiri and yori-taoshi (force out and down). He also regularly used uwatenage (overarm throw).

Career record

See also
Glossary of sumo terms
List of non-Japanese sumo wrestlers
List of past sumo wrestlers

References

External links
 

1983 births
Living people
Mongolian sumo wrestlers
Sportspeople from Ulaanbaatar
Sportspeople banned for life